The 2001 Las Vegas Bowl was the 10th edition of the annual college football bowl game. It featured the Utah Utes and the USC Trojans.

Game summary
The game was dominated by defense. Utah opened the scoring on a 3-yard touchdown run by Adam Tate, leading 7–0. They increased their lead to 10–0 in the second quarter, with a 26-yard field goal from Ryan Kaneshiro. That would be their final score of the game. In the third quarter, USC's Sunny Byrd scored a touchdown from 2 yards out, but the extra point missed leaving the score 10–6. Utah held on to win the game over USC.

References

External links
Review of game by USA Today

Las Vegas Bowl
Las Vegas Bowl
Utah Utes football bowl games
USC Trojans football bowl games
Las
December 2001 sports events in the United States